Joy Page (born Joy Cerrette Paige; November 9, 1924 – April 18, 2008) was an American actress. She is best known for her role as the Bulgarian refugee Annina Brandel in Casablanca (1942). She was sometimes credited as Joanne Page.

Early life
Page was the daughter of Mexican-American silent film star Don Alvarado (born José Ray Paige, in New Mexico) and Ann Boyar, the daughter of Russian Jewish immigrants. Her parents divorced when she was eight. 

In 1936, her mother married Jack L. Warner, then head of Warner Bros. studios. Warner, however, did not encourage his stepdaughter's interest in acting.

Career
Page, who initially thought the script to Casablanca was "old fashioned" and "clichéd", landed the role of Annina Brandel on her own and Warner reluctantly approved. She was only seventeen and fresh out of high school. Page, along with Dooley Wilson and Humphrey Bogart, were the only American-born feature actors in the film.

Warner, however, refused to sign Page to a contract, and she never appeared in another Warner Bros. film. She went on to act in a number of films for other studios, including a featured role in her next film, Kismet in 1944.  She was usually billed as Joanne Page, and also made some television appearances. In 1945, Page married actor William T. Orr. He became a Warner Bros. executive, leading to accusations of nepotism. She retired from acting after appearing in the first season of Disney's miniseries The Swamp Fox in 1959. The year before, in her final film role, she played Prairie Flower, a Sioux Indian and mother of White Bull, played by Sal Mineo, in Tonka..  She also appeared in episode 22 of Wagon Train as the wife of Bill Tawnee (The Bill Tawnee Story Episode 22).

Personal life
Page married actor William T. Orr in 1945.  She died on April 18, 2008, of complications arising from a stroke and pneumonia.

Filmography

References

External links

 
 
 
 
 

1924 births
2008 deaths
American film actresses
American television actresses
Deaths from pneumonia in California
Jewish American actresses
American actresses of Mexican descent
20th-century American actresses
Warner family
20th-century American Jews
21st-century American Jews
21st-century American women